Eusebio Hermenio Correia de Almeida, simply known as Ebi (born June 9, 1985) is a football player. He is the current midfielder for the Timor-Leste national football team.

References

External links

1985 births
Living people
People from Dili
East Timorese footballers
Association football midfielders
Timor-Leste international footballers
F.C. Porto Taibesi players